Catocala helena is a moth of the family Erebidae. It is found in Siberia and Manchuria.

Expansion of its distribution westward, presumably due to human activity, was recorded.

The length of the forewings is about 30 mm.

Subspecies
Catocala helena helena
Catocala helena kurenzovi (Moltrecht, 1927) (South-eastern Siberia)
Catocala helena beicki (Mell, 1936) (Manchuria)

References

External links
Image
Species info

Moths described in 1856
helena
Moths of Asia